Cable Networks Akita, also known as CNA, is a cable provider in Japan with 46,418 connected households as of February 27, 2017. The company was established in June 1985. They acquired the naming rights of the Akita Municipal Gymnasium, the home of Akita Northern Happinets, in 2015.

Location map

References

Akita Northern Happinets
Cable television companies
Companies based in Akita Prefecture
Mass media companies established in 1985
Mass media in Akita (city)
Telecommunications companies established in 1985
1985 establishments in Japan